Astrotheology, astral mysticism, astral religion, astral or stellar theology (also referred to as astral or star worship) is the worship of the stars (individually or together as the night sky), the planets, and other heavenly bodies as deities, or the association of deities with heavenly bodies. In anthropological literature these systems of practice may be referred to as astral cults.

The most common instances of this are Sun gods and Moon gods in polytheistic systems worldwide. Also notable is the association of the planets with deities in Babylonian, and hence in Greco-Roman religion, viz. Mercury, Venus, Mars, Jupiter and Saturn. Gods, goddesses, and demons may also be considered personifications of astronomical phenomena such as lunar eclipses, planetary alignments, and apparent interactions of planetary bodies with stars. The Sabians of Harran, a poorly understood pagan religion that existed in Harran during the early Islamic period (7th–10th century), were known for their astrotheology ('the astral cult').

The term astro-theology was first used in the context of 18th- to 19th-century scholarship aiming at the discovery of the original religion, particularly primitive monotheism.  Astro-theology is any "religious system founded upon the observation of the heavens," and in particular may be monotheistic. More recently, the term astrotheology is used by Jan Irvin, Jordan Maxwell and Andrew Rutajit (2006) in reference to "the earliest known forms of religion and nature worship," advocating the entheogen theory of the origin of religion.

The related term astrolatry usually implies polytheism. Some Abrahamic religions prohibit astrolatry as idolatrous. Pole star worship was also banned by imperial decree in  Heian period Japan.

Etymology
Astrotheology (or astro-theology) comes from Greek ἄστρον astron, which means "star," and the word theologia (θεολογία), a combination of theos (Θεός, 'god') and logia (λογία, 'utterances, sayings, oracles')—the latter word relating to Greek logos (λόγος, 'word, discourse, account, reasoning'), thus "the study of God."

Astrolatry has the suffix -λάτρης, itself related to λάτρις latris, "worshipper" or λατρεύειν latreuein, "to worship" from λάτρον latron, "payment".

History

Ancient and medieval Near East

Egypt

Sopdet is the ancient Egyptian name of the star Sirius and its personification as an Egyptian goddess. Known to the Greeks as Sothis, she was conflated with Isis as a goddess and Anubis as a god.

Sopdet is the consort of Sah, the personified constellation of Orion near Sirius. Their child Venus was the hawk god Sopdu, "Lord of the East". As the "bringer of the New Year and the Nile flood", she was associated with Osiris from an early date and by the Ptolemaic period Sah and Sopdet almost solely appeared in forms conflated with Osiris and Isis.

Mesopotamia
Babylonian astronomy from early times associates stars with deities, but the heavens as the residence of an anthropomorphic pantheon, and later of monotheistic God and his retinue of angels, is a later development, gradually replacing the notion of the pantheon residing or convening on the summit of high mountains. Archibald Sayce (1913) argues a parallelism of the "stellar theology" of Babylon and Egypt, both countries absorbing popular star-worship into the official pantheon of their respective state religions by identification of gods with stars or planets.

The Chaldeans, who came to be seen as the prototypical astrologers and star-worshippers by the Greeks, migrated into Mesopotamia c. 940–860 BCE. Astrotheology does not appear to have been common in the Levant prior to the Iron Age, but becomes popular under Assyrian influence around the 7th-century BCE. The Chaldeans gained ascendancy, ruling Babylonia from 608 to 557 BCE. The Hebrew Bible was substantially composed during this period (roughly corresponding to the period of the Babylonian captivity).

Judaism
The Hebrew Bible contains repeated reference to astrolatry. Deuteronomy 4:19, 17:3 contains a stern warning against worshipping the Sun, Moon, stars or any of the heavenly host. Relapse into worshiping the host of heaven, i.e. the stars, is said to have been the cause of the fall of the kingdom of Judah in II Kings 17:16. King Josiah in 621 BC is recorded as having abolished all kinds of idolatry in Judah, but astrolatry was continued in private (Zeph. 1:5; Jer. 8:2, 19:13). Ezekiel (8:16) describes sun-worship practiced in the court of the temple of Jerusalem, and Jeremiah (44:17) says that even after the destruction of the temple, women in particular insisted on continuing their worship of the 'Queen of Heaven.'

Christianity

Crucifixion darkness is an episode described in three of the canonical gospels in which the sky becomes dark during the day, during the crucifixion of Jesus as a sign of his divinity.

Augustine of Hippo criticized sun- and star-worship in De Vera Religione  (37.68) and  De civitate Dei (5.1–8). Pope Leo the Great also denounced astrolatry and the cult of Sol Invictus, which he contrasted with the Christian nativity.

Islam
Astrolatry is mentioned in the Quran, in the context of the prophet Ibrahim (Abraham)'s observation of celestial bodies in Surat al-An'am.

Sabians

Among the various religious groups which in the 9th and 10th centuries CE came to be identified with the mysterious Sabians mentioned in the Quran (sometimes also spelled 'Sabaeans' or 'Sabeans', but not to be confused with the Sabaeans of South Arabia), at least two groups appear to have engaged in some kind of star worship.

By far the most famous of these two are the Sabians of Harran, adherents of a Hellenized Semitic pagan religion that had managed to survive during the early Islamic period in the Upper Mesopotamian city of Harran. They were described by Syriac Christian heresiographers as star worshippers. Most of the scholars and courtiers working for the Abbasid and Buyid dynasties in Baghdad during the ninth–eleventh centuries who were known as 'Sabians' were either members of this Harranian religion or descendants of such members, most notably the Harranian astronomers and mathematicians Thabit ibn Qurra (died 901) and al-Battani (died 929). There has been some speculation on whether these Sabian families in Baghdad, on whom most of our information about the Harranian Sabians indirectly depends, may have practiced a different, more philosophically inspired variant of the original Harranian religion. However, apart from the fact that it contains traces of Babylonian and Hellenistic religion, and that an important place was taken by planets (to whom ritual sacrifices were made), little is known about Harranian Sabianism. They have been variously described by scholars as (neo)-Platonists, Hermeticists, or Gnostics, but there is no firm evidence for any of these identifications.

Apart from the Sabians of Harran, there were also various religious groups living in the Mesopotamian Marshes who were called the 'Sabians of the Marshes'. Though this name has often been understood as a reference to the Mandaeans, there was in fact at least one other religious group living in the marshlands of Southern Iraq. This group still held on to a pagan belief related to Babylonian religion, in which Mesopotamian gods had already been venerated in the form of planets and stars since antiquity. According to Ibn al-Nadim, our only source for these star-worshipping 'Sabians of the Marshes', they "follow the doctrines of the ancient Aramaeans [] and venerate the stars". However, there is also a large corpus of texts by Ibn Wahshiyya (died c. 930), most famously his Nabataean Agriculture, which describes at length the customs and beliefs — many of them going back to Mespotamian models — of Iraqi Sabians living in the Sawād.

Asia

China

Star worship was widespread in Asia, especially in Mongolia and northern China, and also spread to Korea. According to Edward Schafer, star worship was already established during the Han dynasty (202 BCE–220 CE), with the Nine Imperial Gods becoming star lords. This star worship, along with indigenous shamanism and medical practice, formed one of the original bases of Taoism. The Heavenly Sovereign was identified with the Big Dipper and the North Star.

The Sanxing are the gods of the three stars or constellations considered essential in Chinese astrology and mythology: Jupiter, Ursa Major, and Sirius. Fu, Lu, and Shou, or Cai, Zi and Shou are also the embodiments of Fortune (Fu), presiding over planet Jupiter, Prosperity (Lu), presiding over Ursa Major, and Longevity (Shou), presiding over Sirius.

During the Tang dynasty, Chinese Buddhism adopted Taoist Big Dipper worship, borrowing various texts and rituals which were then modified to conform with Buddhist practices and doctrines. The cult of the Big Dipper was eventually absorbed into the cults of various Buddhist divinities, Myōken being one of these.

Japan
Star worship was also practiced in Japan. Japanese star worship is largely based on Chinese cosmology. According to Bernard Faure, "the cosmotheistic nature of esoteric Buddhism provided an easy bridge for cultural translation between Indian and Chinese cosmologies, on the one hand, and between Indian astrology and local Japanese folk beliefs about the stars, on the other."

The cult of Myōken is thought to have been brought into Japan during the 7th century by immigrants (toraijin) from Goguryeo and Baekje. During the reign of Emperor Tenji (661–672), the toraijin were resettled in the easternmost parts of the country; as a result, Myōken worship spread throughout the eastern provinces.

By the Heian period, pole star worship had become widespread enough that imperial decrees banned it for the reason that it involved "mingling of men and women," and thus caused ritual impurity. Pole star worship was also forbidden among the inhabitants of the capital and nearby areas when the imperial princess (saiō) made her way to Ise to begin her service at the shrines. Nevertheless, the cult of the pole star left its mark on imperial rituals such as the emperor's enthronement and the worship of the imperial clan deity at Ise Shrine. Worship of the pole star was also practiced in Onmyōdō, where it was deified as Chintaku Reifujin (鎮宅霊符神).

Myōken worship was particularly prevalent among clans based in eastern Japan (the modern Kantō and Tōhoku regions), with the Kanmu Taira clan (Kanmu Heishi) and their offshoots such as the Chiba and the Sōma clans being among the deity's notable devotees. One legend claims that Taira no Masakado was a devotee of Myōken, who aided him in his military exploits. When Masakado grew proud and arrogant, the deity withdrew his favor and instead aided Masakado's uncle Yoshifumi, the ancestor of the Chiba clan. Owing to his status as the Chiba clan's ujigami (guardian deity), temples and shrines dedicated to Myōken are particularly numerous in former Chiba territories. Myōken worship is also prevalent in many Nichiren-shū Buddhist temples due to the clan's connections with the school's Nakayama lineage.

The Americas
In North America, star worship was practiced by the Lakota people and the Wichita people.

In South America, the Incas engaged in star worship.

Modern views

18th century
The term astro-theology first appears in the title of a 1714 work by William Derham,  Astro-theology: or, A demonstration of the being and attributes of God, from a survey of the heavens based on the author's observations by means of "Mr. Huygens' Glass." Derham thought that the stars were openings in the firmament through which he thought he saw the Empyrean beyond. The 1783 issue of The New Christian's magazine had an essay entitled Astro-theology which argued the "demonstration of sacred truths" from "a survey of heavenly bodies" in the sense of the watchmaker analogy. Edward Higginson (1855) argues a compatibility of "Jewish Astro-theology" of the Hebrew Bible, which places God and his angelic hosts in the heavens, with a "Scientific Astro-theology" based on observation of the cosmos.

20th century

Thelema
Nuit (alternatively Nu, Nut, or Nuith) is a goddess in Thelema, the speaker in the first chapter of The Book of the Law, the sacred text written or received in 1904 by Aleister Crowley. She is based on the Ancient Egyptian sky goddess Nut, who arches over her husband/brother, Geb (Earth god). She is usually depicted as a naked woman covered with stars. In The Book of the Law she says of herself: "I am Infinite Space, and the Infinite Stars thereof", and in other sections she is given the titles "Queen of Heaven," and "Queen of Space."

21st century
The term astrotheology is used by Jan Irvin, Jordan Maxwell and Andrew Rutajit (2006) in reference to "the earliest known forms of religion and nature worship," advocating the entheogen theory of the origin of religion.

See also
 
Archeoastronomy
Astraea
Astraeus
Astronomy and religion
Astrological age
Babylonian astrology
Behenian fixed star
Body of light
Ceremonial magic
Decan
Eosphorus
Hellenistic astrology
History of astrology
History of astronomy
Lunar station
Magic and religion
Natural theology
Nature worship
Pantheon
Planets in astrology
Pleiades in folklore and literature
Religious cosmology
Renaissance magic
Royal stars
Seven Heavens
Sidereal compass rose
Stars in astrology
Sky father
Star people
Stellar deities
Venusian deities

Notes

References

Citations

Works cited

	

 [reprinted in ]

.

Further reading

External links

The Development, Heyday, and Demise of Panbabylonism by Gary D. Thompson
Native American Star Lore Dakota and Lakota
The Star Mandala at Kyoto National Museum
Star Worship in Japan, 28 Constellations (Lunar Mansions, Moon Stations), Pole Star, Big Dipper, Planets, Nine Luminaries

 
Astrology
Ceremonial magic
Eastern esotericism
Esoteric cosmology
History of astronomy
Religious cosmologies
Religious faiths, traditions, and movements
Sabaeans
Thelema
Western esotericism